James Marcus may refer to:

James Marcus (American actor) (1867–1937), American actor
James Marcus (English actor) (born 1942), English actor
James Marcus (Resident Evil), video game character
James S. Marcus (1929–2015), American investment banker and philanthropist